Beauregard is a commune in the Ain department in eastern France.

History
Beauregard takes its name from the castle built in 1290 by Gui de Chabeu on a hill overlooking the Saône and the hills of Beaujolais. The castle fell into ruin in about 1735. Restoration began in the 19th century and continues today.

A fire destroyed much of the village, and few old dwellings remain.

On 31 December 1954, Fareins-les-Beauregard was taken from Fareins and attached to Beauregard.

Population

See also
Communes of the Ain department

References

External links

"Bridgemeister" website entry regarding an 1831 suspension bridge in Beauregard

Communes of Ain
Dombes